= Dmitri Razmazin =

Russian footballer

Personal information
- Full name: Dmitri Leonidovich Razmazin
- Date of birth: 14 October 1976 (age 50)
- Height: 1.80 m (5 ft 11 in)
- Position: Defender

Senior career*
Years	Team	Apps	(Gls)
1994	FC Stroitel Tyumen		
1995–1999	FC Tyumen	11	(0)
1995–1996	→ FC Dynamo-Gazovik-d Tyumen (loans)	24	(1)
- * Club domestic league appearances and goals

Dmitri Leonidovich Razmazin (Russian: Дмитрий Леонидович Размазин; born 14 October 1976) is a Russian former football player.
